Sant Kumar Tharu is a Nepalese politician, belonging to the Communist Party of Nepal.

History 
In the 2008 Constituent Assembly election he was elected from the Bardiya-3 constituency, winning 23663 votes. He won the Bardiya–3 seat in 2013 Nepalese Constituent Assembly election from the Unified Communist Party of Nepal (Maoist).

References

Living people
Communist Party of Nepal (Maoist Centre) politicians
Nepalese atheists
Place of birth missing (living people)
Members of the 1st Nepalese Constituent Assembly
Members of the 2nd Nepalese Constituent Assembly
Nepal MPs 2017–2022
1969 births